Aristavėlė (formerly) is a village in Kėdainiai district municipality, in Kaunas County, in central Lithuania. According to the 2011 census, the village had a population of 6 people.

There is a site of a former manor (the wooden palace building was moved to the Museum of the Lithuanian Folk Life in 1987) and relics of a former chapel (built in 1744).

History 
One of the oldest known Lithuanian manors (a property of nobleman Algimantas) was located in Aristavėlė (formerly Aristava). It belonged to the Dębski family in the 18th century and to the Gintautai in 1863. Another palace by the Malčius river was a property of the Zabielos and the Medekšos.

Demography

Images

References

Villages in Kaunas County
Kėdainiai District Municipality